Neoterpes trianguliferata, the canary thorn, is a moth in the family Geometridae. The species was first described by Alpheus Spring Packard in 1871. It is found in North America.

The MONA or Hodges number for Neoterpes trianguliferata is 6860.

References

Further reading

External links

 

Ourapterygini
Articles created by Qbugbot
Moths described in 1871